Arthur Otis Howe (March 7, 1871 – November 27, 1951) was a dairy farmer and electrical engineer from Newfane, Vermont and a Republican member of the Vermont House of Representatives, serving from 1931 to 1933 and then reelected in 1937 and 1945.  He also served in the Vermont Senate from 1947 to 1948.

Personal background and family relations
Arthur Otis Howe was born in Newfane, Vermont to Marshall Otis Howe (1832–1919) and Gertrude Isabel (Dexter) Howe (1845–1930). He was never married. He was a dairy farmer in Newfane, Vermont and as a trained electrical engineer, he served in his early adult years as the superintendent of the electric light works in Chelsea, Vermont.  In 1931 he was elected to his first term in the Vermont House of Representatives, serving until 1933.  He was reelected in 1937 and 1945.  He was elected to the Vermont Senate, and served from 1947 to 1948.  Howe died at his home in Newfane.  Howe was a direct descendant of John Howe (1602-1680) who arrived in Massachusetts Bay Colony in 1630 from Brinklow, Warwickshire, England and settled in Sudbury, Massachusetts. Arthur Otis Howe was also a descendant of Edmund Rice, an early immigrant to Massachusetts Bay Colony, as follows:

 Arthur Otis Howe, son of
 Marshall Otis Howe (1832-1919), son of
 Otis Howe (1793-1872), son of
 Gardner Howe (1759-1854), son of
 Priscilla Rice (1731-?), daughter of
 Luke Rice (1689-1754), son of
 Daniel Rice (1655-1737), son of
 Edward Rice (1622-1712), son of
 Edmund Rice, (ca1594-1663)

References 

1871 births
1951 deaths
People from Newfane, Vermont
Republican Party members of the Vermont House of Representatives